Holland Apartments is a historic apartment complex located at 324-326 N. Vermilion St. in Danville, Illinois. The building was constructed in two sections; the northern half was built in 1906, while the southern half was completed in 1927. Both sections of the building are designed in the Dutch Revival style; architect Charles M. Lewis developed the original design in 1906. The front and side facades each feature multiple stepped gables; the front-facing gables are flanked by dormers. The first floor, which originally housed four stores and a restaurant, features arched entrances, a brick parapet, and extensive corbelling. The Dutch Revival style is rare in the Midwest, and the building is the only Dutch Revival structure in the Danville or Champaign areas.

The building was added to the National Register of Historic Places on November 16, 1988.

References

Residential buildings on the National Register of Historic Places in Illinois
Dutch Colonial Revival architecture in the United States
Apartment buildings in Illinois
Residential buildings completed in 1906
Buildings and structures in Danville, Illinois
National Register of Historic Places in Vermilion County, Illinois
1906 establishments in Illinois